Jennifer Kydd (born 1976) is a Canadian actress best known for her role as Paige Bradshaw in the Global series Falcon Beach.

Biography
Kydd was born in 1976 in St. Margarets Bay, Nova Scotia, grew up in Cole Harbour and later moved back to St. Margaret's Bay in her early teens. She attended Acadia University, where she majored in the Theatre Program. Kydd currently lives in Toronto.

Filmography
 Cry of the Owl (2009) .... Susie Escham (completed)
 The Dresden Files (2 episodes, Unaired Pilot: Storm Front and Storm Front, 2007-2008) .... Grace Cutler
 Falcon Beach (26 episodes, 2006-2007) .... Paige Bradshaw
 General Hospital (1 episode, 2007) .... Lawyer
 Falcon Beach (2005) (TV) .... Paige Bradshaw
 Doc (1 episode, Nip, Tuck and Die, 2004) .... Nurse Carla
 Wild Card (1 episode, Block Party, 2004) .... Woman at Party
 Rush of Fear (2003) (TV) .... Rental Car Agent
 Love That Boy (2003) .... Nikki
 Heart of a Stranger (2002) (TV) .... Waitress

References

External links
 
 

Living people
1976 births
Canadian film actresses
Canadian television actresses
Actresses from Nova Scotia